A Dream, What Else? is a 1995 Austrian-German drama film written and directed by Hans-Jürgen Syberberg. It stars Edith Clever as Sybille von Bismarck, the daughter-in-law of Otto von Bismarck.

Plot
The film consists of a monologue where the main character, aged and widowed, mourns the defeat of Prussia at the end of World War II. She recites from The Trojan Women by Euripides, The Prince of Homburg by Heinrich von Kleist and Faust: Part II (1832) by Johann Wolfgang von Goethe.

Production

The monologue was first performed on stage in Berlin in 1990 and toured several countries during the following years. The film was shot in the summer 1994 at Szene-Theater in Salzburg, Austria, for Szene Salzburg and ORF. It was produced through Syberberg's German company TMS Film.

References

External links

1990s historical drama films
1995 films
Films based on works by Euripides
Films based on works by Heinrich von Kleist
Films based on works by Johann Wolfgang von Goethe
Films directed by Hans-Jürgen Syberberg
Films shot in Austria
Films set in Germany
Austrian historical drama films
German historical drama films
1990s German-language films
German World War II films
Films set in 1945
Monodrama
1995 drama films
Modern adaptations of works by Euripides
1990s German films